Alexandre Plokhov (born 1967, Naro-Fominsk, USSR) is a Russian-born American clothing designer.  He created designs for the Cloak and Versace labels before creating his own brand in 2011.

Early life and education
Plokhov originally trained as an interpreter and previously served in this capacity with the Russian Strategic Missile Troops.  In the mid 1990s he made the career switch to design and moved to the United States.

Career in fashion
Plokhov worked first as a custom tailor and later as a pattern maker for Marc Jacobs.

In 2000, he founded the fashion label Cloak.  Cloak won the Ecco Domani award in 2003 and was the recipient of both the 2005 CFDA Swarovski Perry Ellis Award for Menswear and the 2004 CFDA/Vogue Fashion Foundation Fund Award.  Known for his 'military goth' style, Plokhov was noted for his razor sharp tailoring, details and luxurious fabrics.

Cloak opened a boutique in 2005 on Greene Street in New York City's SoHo neighborhood. Cloak continued to exhibit fashions in New York, and collaborated with Uniqlo via the Designer Invitation Project along with other well known New York designers.  Cloak's last season was Spring 2007. In 2008 the Cloak boutique was shuttered due to partnership disagreements.

In March 2007 Plokhov was hired as the Head Designer for Gianni Versace Uomo in Milan, Italy.  Alexandre changed Versace's menswear offering, presenting a toned down palette and elements of classic menswear. He designed for six seasons in Milan with Versace.

In 2010 Alexandre returned to New York City to launch a line under his own name for Autumn/Winter 2011.  Showing a presentation in Paris and a film directed by Douglas Keeve (Unzipped), Alexandre reentered the industry with an offering targeted at his previous, now somewhat more mature, Cloak customers.  Again he used a strict palette of greys, black and neutrals with a more minimal aesthetic than previously with his time at Cloak. Style called his 2012 collection 'severe' and praised his 'incredible' tailoring.

Plokhov's Spring 2013 collection included influences from the clothing of Russian Orthodox monks in Zimbardo's book "The Monks of Dust." In 2014 Plokhov has been named as the creative director for Helmut Lang. His fashions have continued to be dominated by black, white and grey, with minimal draping.

On December 17, 2015, it was announced through his Instagram that his label would be shutting down at the end of the year.

Related Links 

Official website

Interview with Alexandre Plokhov

References 

1967 births
Living people
American fashion designers